Temporarily Disconnected is the fourth album by 24-7 Spyz. It features the reunion of the band's classic lineup, including mainstays Jimi Hazel and Rick Skatore along with the return of vocalist P. Fluid (now using his proper last name, Forrest) and drummer Anthony Johnson. The reunion and subsequent album were based on the lingering popularity of this particular lineup in Europe (where it was released exclusively) following the breakup of Strength in Numbers lineup.

The sound of Temporarily Disconnected mixes soul, funk, jazz, and heavy metal.

The album was seen by many critics, fans and even some band members as a step backwards from the focused effort of Strength in Numbers. Once again, problems between P. Fluid and the rest of the band came to a head following a 1995 European tour, with Fluid and Johnson exiting the band again shortly thereafter.

Like many 24-7 Spyz albums, this recording is out of print. However, the album is available through iTunes.

Track listing
All songs written by P. Fluid, except for where noted.
 "Dogs Come Out" - 2:27
 "Outta Mind, Outta Time" (Jimi Hazel) - 3:42
 "Fire & Water" - 1:54
 "Why?" (Hazel) - 3:57
 "Body Thief" - 3:33
 "Choose Me" (Rick Skatore) - 4:41
 "Heart of Fire" (Skatore) - 6:05
 "Stoner" - 5:55
 "Boots" - 3:23
 "Agroovendeel" (Hazel) - 4:26
 "Choose Me ("For Those Who Like It Rough in the Middle" Remix)" (Skatore) - 4:43

Personnel
 P. Fluid (credited as Forrest): vocals
 Jimi Hazel: guitar
 Rick Skatore: bass
 Anthony Johnson: drums

References

1995 albums
24-7 Spyz albums
Enemy Records albums